John Charles Chapman (23 July 1930 – 16 November 2012), affectionately known as "Chappo", was an Australian preacher, Bible teacher and evangelist associated with the Sydney Anglican diocese. He wrote several books, including A Fresh Start; Know and Tell the Gospel; Setting Hearts on Fire, A Sinner's Guide to Holiness; and Making the Most of the Rest of Your Life, all published by Matthias Media. The Australian edition of A Fresh Start has sold nearly 40,000 copies since 1999.

Having begun his career as a teacher, Chapman shifted to Anglican ministry, his first curacy being at Moree. There he organised the Billy Graham Crusade landline services for the whole of Moree there. He started an interchurch prayer meeting in the Warriors Chapel of Moree's Anglican church in 1959 which is still going today. This is where he met Preston Walker, Aborigines Welfare District Officer and member of the Moree Methodist Church who later joined the British and Foreign Bible Society. Chapman valued the Christian fellowship of Preston and Kath Walker as they were former United Aborigines Mission missionaries from Western Australia and were evangelical Christians. Chapman taught woodwork in Moree before becoming a curate at Moree.

For 25 years he was the Director of the Anglican Department of Evangelism in Sydney, after beginning his career as a school teacher prior to theological training. In his retirement he continued to teach at Bible colleges, to speak at conventions around the world and to find time for the occasional game of tennis and golf.

Thousands heard his "persuasive, sane and happy preaching" presentations of the Gospel. But it was his shaping of young preachers, from Phillip Jensen to Steve Chong that brought him a lasting legacy.

The single men's accommodation at Moore Theological College was renamed John Chapman House in Chapman's honour. A biography, written by Michael Orpwood, was published in 1995 entitled Chappo: For the Sake of the Gospel. The foreword was provided by Dick Lucas - formerly rector of St Helen's Bishopsgate - a long-standing friend of Chapman.

References

Further reading
 
 

Australian Anglicans
Clergy from Sydney
Australian evangelicals
1930 births
2012 deaths
Academic staff of Moore Theological College
Moore Theological College alumni